The 1991–92 NBA season was the 24th season for the Phoenix Suns in the National Basketball Association. In the off-season, the Suns acquired three-point specialist Trent Tucker from the New York Knicks. However, Tucker never played for the team as he was released to free agency, and later on signed with the San Antonio Spurs. The Suns were led by head coach Cotton Fitzsimmons, which would be the last of his four-season second stint as coach of the Suns. All home games were played at Arizona Veterans Memorial Coliseum. The team got off to a slow 5–9 start, but went on a nine-game winning streak as they won 14 of their next 15 games, and held a 32–16 record at the All-Star break. The Suns finished third in the Pacific Division with a 53–29 record.

Guard Jeff Hornacek led the Suns in scoring, averaging 20.1 points per game plus contributing 5.1 assists and 2.0 steals per game. In addition, Kevin Johnson averaged 19.7 points and led the team with 10.7 assists per game, while sixth man Dan Majerle provided the team with 17.3 points, 5.9 rebounds and 1.6 steals per game off the bench, and Tom Chambers, at 32 years of age, appeared in 69 games and contributed 16.3 points and 5.8 rebounds per game. Tim Perry stepped into the lineup averaging 12.3 points, 6.9 rebounds and 1.5 blocks per game, while Andrew Lang replaced Mark West in the lineup at center, averaging 7.7 points, 6.7 rebounds and leading the team with 2.5 blocks per game. Hornacek finished the season third in three-point field goal percentage at .439, while Johnson's assist average was good for second-best in the league.

In the Western Conference First Round of the playoffs, the Suns swept the Spurs in three straight games, but lost 4–1 to the Portland Trail Blazers in the Western Conference Semi-finals. The Blazers would lose in six games to the defending champion Chicago Bulls in the NBA Finals.

Hornacek and Majerle were both selected for the 1992 NBA All-Star Game, while by season's end, Johnson was selected to the All-NBA Third Team, and second-year forward Cedric Ceballos won the Slam Dunk Contest during the All-Star Weekend in Orlando. Following the season, Hornacek, Perry and Lang were all traded to the Philadelphia 76ers.

Draft picks

Roster

Roster Notes
 Rookie small forward Richard Dumas was suspended for violating the NBA's substance abuse policy.

Regular season

Season standings

y – clinched division title
x – clinched playoff spot

z – clinched division title
y – clinched division title
x – clinched playoff spot

Record vs. opponents

Game log

Playoffs

Game log

|- align="center" bgcolor="#ccffcc"
| 1
| April 24
| San Antonio
| W 117–111
| Dan Majerle (25)
| Cedric Ceballos (9)
| Kevin Johnson (17)
| Arizona Veterans Memorial Coliseum14,496
| 1–0
|- align="center" bgcolor="#ccffcc"
| 2
| April 26
| San Antonio
| W 119–107
| Hornacek, Perry (31)
| Lang, Perry (10)
| Kevin Johnson (19)
| Arizona Veterans Memorial Coliseum14,496
| 2–0
|- align="center" bgcolor="#ccffcc"
| 3
| April 29
| @ San Antonio
| W 101–92
| Hornacek, Johnson (22)
| Tim Perry (9)
| Kevin Johnson (11)
| HemisFair Arena14,853
| 3–0

|- align="center" bgcolor="#ffcccc"
| 1
| May 5
| @ Portland
| L 111–113
| Kevin Johnson (24)
| Chambers, Johnson (8)
| Jeff Hornacek (12)
| Memorial Coliseum12,888
| 0–1
|- align="center" bgcolor="#ffcccc"
| 2
| May 7
| @ Portland
| L 119–126
| Kevin Johnson (35)
| Jeff Hornacek (11)
| Dan Majerle (6)
| Memorial Coliseum12,888
| 0–2
|- align="center" bgcolor="#ccffcc"
| 3
| May 9
| Portland
| W 124–117
| Jeff Hornacek (30)
| Majerle, Perry (9)
| Kevin Johnson (16)
| Arizona Veterans Memorial Coliseum14,496
| 1–2
|- align="center" bgcolor="#ffcccc"
| 4
| May 11
| Portland
| L 151–153 (2OT)
| Kevin Johnson (35)
| Dan Majerle (11)
| Kevin Johnson (14)
| Arizona Veterans Memorial Coliseum14,496
| 1–3
|- align="center" bgcolor="#ffcccc"
| 5
| May 14
| @ Portland
| L 106–118
| Chambers, Perry (19)
| Tom Chambers (8)
| Kevin Johnson (6)
| Memorial Coliseum12,888
| 1–4
|-

Awards and honors

Week/Month
 Jeff Hornacek was named Player of the Month for December.
 Cotton Fitzsimmons was named Coach of the Month for December.

All-Star
 Jeff Hornacek was selected as a reserve for the Western Conference in the All-Star Game. It was his first and only All-Star selection. Hornacek finished seventh in voting among Western Conference guards with 271,180 votes.
 Dan Majerle was selected as a reserve for the Western Conference in the All-Star Game. It was his first All-Star selection.
 Other Suns players receiving All-Star votes were Tom Chambers (406,185) and Kevin Johnson (309,820).
 Cedric Ceballos won the Slam Dunk Contest, winning the competition with the famous "Hocus Pocus" blindfolded dunk.
 Jeff Hornacek participated in the Three-Point Shootout, losing to champion and former Suns teammate Craig Hodges.

Season
 Kevin Johnson was named to the All-NBA Third Team. Johnson also finished 14th in MVP voting.
 Dan Majerle finished third in Sixth Man of the Year voting.

Player statistics

Season

Playoffs

† – Minimum 20 field goals made.
^ – Minimum 5 three-pointers made.
+ – Minimum 10 free throws made.

Transactions

Trades

Free agents

Additions

Subtractions

Player Transactions Citation:

See also
 1991–92 NBA season

References

Phoenix Suns seasons